Portman may refer to:

 Viscount Portman

Office
 Portman (burgess), a freeman or burgess of a port

People 

 Maurice Vidal Portman, British doctor
 Bob Portman, American basketball player
 Eric Portman, English stage and film actor
 John C. Portman Jr., American architect and real estate developer
 Natalie Portman, Israeli actress
 Rachel Portman, British composer
 Stephen Portman, American conductor and pianist
 Rob Portman, American politician
 Sir William Portman (died 1557), English judge and Chief Justice of the King’s Bench
 Adolf Portmann, Swiss Zoologist
 Jacob Portman, lead character in Ransom Riggs's novel Miss Peregrine's Home for Peculiar Children.

Places
 Portmán, a town near Cartagena, Spain
 Orchard Portman, a village and civil parish in Somerset, England
 Portman Estate, 110 acres in Marylebone in London’s West End
 Portman Road,  a football stadium in Ipswich, Suffolk, England
 Port Mann Bridge, a bridge in British Columbia

Boats 
 Portman 36, an American sailboat design

See also
 Portman Building Society
 Portman Group

 Pforzheim
 Port

Disambiguation pages
Place name disambiguation pages